Paradise is a locality and small rural community in the local government area of Kentish in the North West region of Tasmania.
The 2016 census determined a population of 112 for the state suburb of Paradise.

History
The name “Paradise” was used by an early visitor because of the area's natural beauty, and then came into general use. Paradise was gazetted as a locality in 1965.

Geography
The Dasher River forms a small part of the north-western boundary before passing through to the north and forming part of the northern boundary.

Road infrastructure
The C137 route (Paradise Road / Union Bridge Road) passes through the locality from north to south. Route C157 (Beulah Road) starts at an intersection with C137 and runs east along the eastern boundary before turning north towards Beulah.

References

Localities of Kentish Council
Towns in Tasmania